Probably Science is a weekly comedy and science podcast which first aired on January 21, 2012. The show is co-hosted by Andy Wood, Matt Kirshen, and Jesse Case. Former co-host and founding member Brooks Wheelan left the show in 2013 for personal reasons and has since returned as a guest. In Brooks' absence, Case, previously a guest, was brought on as a co-host.

The podcast focuses on current scientific news. Occasionally it explores different facets of relevant media, including the host's comedy careers, as well as the large array of careers and hobbies held by the guests.

A wide range of guest have appeared in their episodes, including astronaut Chris Hadfield, astrophysicist Neil deGrasse Tyson, comedian Chris Hardwick, Sean M. Carroll (a research professor in the Department of Physics at the California Institute of Technology), and two appearances from Doctor Who and Guardians of the Galaxy actress Karen Gillan.

Episodes

References

External links
 

Science podcasts
Comedy and humor podcasts
2012 podcast debuts
Audio podcasts
American podcasts